Reality Show is the third studio album by American R&B singer Jazmine Sullivan. It was released by RCA Records on January 13, 2015, in the United States. Sullivan recorded the album, her first in five years, during a hiatus from the music industry, writing and working with producers such as Anthony Bell, Salaam Remi, and Key Wane. Reality Show received widespread acclaim from critics and sold 30,000 copies in its first week.

Background
In January 2011, after having released her second album Love Me Back (2010), Sullivan announced via Twitter that she was indefinitely leaving the music industry saying, "I promised myself when it wasn't fun anymore I wouldn't do it. And, here I am. I'm not saying I won't ever sing again in my life because I don't believe that. But in this moment… right now… [I] got some things to figure out". In 2014, she announced her new album, Reality Show. In a 2014 interview with Billboard, Sullivan described her return as inevitable saying she "...can't escape [her] calling."

Release and reception

Reality Show was released by RCA Records on January 13, 2015. In its first week, it debuted at number 12 on the Billboard 200 and sold 30,000 copies in the United States.

Reality Show received widespread acclaim from critics. At Metacritic, which assigns a normalized rating out of 100 to reviews from mainstream publications, it received an average score of 85, based on 9 reviews. In The New York Times, Jon Pareles said the record shrewdly mixes older elements of soul music with modern drum programming, while the themes of romantic dysfunction intensify and inspire Sullivan's singing. "Playing a woman too often scorned", Pareles wrote, "she comes out victoriously soulful." AllMusic's Andy Kellman felt she sings more confidently than before and concluded in his review, "Just as potent and lasting as Fearless and Love Me Back, Reality Show completes one of the most impressive first-three-album runs." Ryan B. Patrick of Exclaim! stated that Sullivan's return was a welcome one, as she delivers "an R&B album that feels like how R&B used to sound circa late 1990s/early 2000 while still coming off as forward-looking". Pitchfork critic David Drake hailed Sullivan's voice as the best in contemporary R&B and said "her songs work so well because they allow the listener to experience them at face value or more holistically, shifting perspectives as rapidly as in life itself.".

Accolades 
Reality Show was ranked number 44 on Pitchforks list of 2015's best albums, while Rap-Up named it the year's tenth best record. It was also nominated for the 2015 Grammy Award for Best R&B Album, while the song "Let It Burn" received nominations in the categories of Best R&B Song and Best Traditional R&B Performance.

Track listing

Sample credits:

“Let It Burn” samples “Ready or Not” by After 7.

Personnel
Credits are adapted from AllMusic.

 Anthony Bell – instrumentation, musician, producer, programming
 Tyler Bellinger  – choir, chorus
 Amber Bullock  – vocals (background)
 Maddox Chimm  – assistant
 Da Internz  – producer
 Kevin "KD" Davis – mixing
 Dilemma – producer
 Gleyder "Gee" Disla – engineer
 DJ Dahi – keyboards, producer, programming
 Peter Edge – producer
 Twanetta M. Ferebee-Brown – choir, chorus
 Benjamin Freedlander – keyboards, producer
 Joe Gallagher – engineer, vocal engineer
 Erwin Gorostiza – creative director
 Jeff Halsey – assistant
 Kevin Hanson – guitar
 Stacey Harcum – choir, chorus
 Chuck Harmony – producer
 Michelle Holme – art direction, design
 Jaycen Joshua – mixing
 Trevor Jerideau – A&R, producer
 JoeLogic – producer
 Mike "Guru" Johnson – production coordination
 Ryan Kaul – assistant
 Dave Kutch – mastering
 Erik Madrid – mixing
 Shane McCauley – photography
 Meek Mill – featured artist
 Sophia Nicole Stephens – choir, chorus
 Gary Noble – mixing
 Tyron Perrin – vocals (background)
 Karl Peterson – engineer
 Kevin Randolph – keyboards
 Salaam Remi – A&R, arranger, drums, keyboards, producer
 Nicole Renee – choir, chorus
 Tony Russell – bass,
 Richard "Tubbs" Smith – keyboards
 Christopher Stevens – trumpet
 Jazmine Sullivan – executive producer, primary artist, producer, vocals (background)
 Pamela Sullivan – vocals (background)
 Laurin Talese – choir, chorus
 Dan Thomas – drum programming
 Vincent Vu – assistant
 Key Wane – arranger, bass, drums, keyboards, producer
 Matt Wong – bass, keyboards, strings
 Kenta Yonesaka – engineer

Charts

Weekly charts

Year-end charts

References

External links
 

2015 albums
Jazmine Sullivan albums
RCA Records albums